The Divine Folly is a novel by Baroness Orczy, creator of the Scarlet Pimpernel.

Plot introduction
Two English brothers travel across Europe as members of a secret society that is plotting the assassination of Napoleon III.

1937 British novels
Historical novels
Novels by Baroness Emma Orczy
Hodder & Stoughton books
Cultural depictions of Napoleon III